Joseph Loscombe Richards, D.D.(b Tamerton Foliot 21 October 1798; d Oxford 21 October 1854) was an Oxford college head in the 19th century.

Richards was educated at Exeter College, Oxford. He was a Fellow there from 1818 to 1837; and Rector from 1838 until his death. An ordained Anglican priest, he was also Rector of Bushey from 1835 to 1838.

References

Alumni of Exeter College, Oxford
Rectors of Exeter College, Oxford
Fellows of Exeter College, Oxford
1798 births
1854 deaths
19th-century English Anglican priests
Clergy from Plymouth, Devon